Khinwara a town in Rani Station tehsil, Pali District, Rajasthan, India. It is located on the Western Railways Ahmedabad to Delhi rail line, between Rani Station And Marwar Junction stations. It does not have a station. It is very close to Marwar junction which is one of the way to go khinwara it is approx 30 min distance. It has a bus stand and one government-run higher secondary school. And near 500 m Guda Thakuraji village and village to 1 km Guda Thakuraji dhani Dewasi cast home and opposite 33/11 Sub station Khinwara famous name  "Balaji ki Nagary".

External links
 Khinwara at Wikimapia Bhikaram dewasi

Villages in Pali district